Juan Rodolfo Laise OFM Cap (22 February 1926 – 22 July 2019) was an Argentine Catholic bishop.

Rodolfo Laise was born in Argentina and was ordained to the priesthood in 1949. He was appointed titular bishop of Iomnium and coadjutor bishop of the San Luis, Argentina, in 1971. He then served as bishop of the diocese from 1971 until Pope John Paul II accepted his resignation for reasons of age on 6 June 2001.

Notes

1926 births
2019 deaths
20th-century Roman Catholic bishops in Argentina
Roman Catholic bishops of San Luis
Capuchin bishops